The Kenya women's national volleyball team, the Malkia Strikers, represents Kenya in international volleyball competitions. Kenya has dominated the African continent since the 1990s, winning the Women's African Volleyball Championship a record nine times. They have qualified three times for the Olympics; in 2000, 2004 and for the postponed 2020 Summer Olympics in Tokyo.

Kenya also has a beach volleyball team, who were the only women's team at the Tokyo Olympics. Kenya's women's sitting volleyball team did not qualify for Tokyo.

History
Women were not invited to play volleyball at the All-Africa Games until 1978. Those games were in Algiers, Algeria and Kenya did not send a team. The team was there in 1991 for the Volleyball at the 1991 All-Africa Games where they were first. They were also in Cairo when eight teams were present for the 1991 Women's African Volleyball Championship and Kenya again took the gold medal.

Violet Barasa, as national team captain, lead the national team to its appearances at the 2000 Summer Olympics and the 2004 Summer Olympics. At both events they finished eleventh.

In 2006 the team's coach was the Japanese coach Sadatoshi Sugawara who was assisted by Paul Bitok. They contested the FIVB World Championships in Japan although the team was said to lack professional players as the chosen team were students or players who were based in Japan.

In 2007 their coach Sammy Kirongo led them to a seventh Women's African Volleyball Championship victory. That year's championships was in Nairobi and the final was against Algeria. The Kenyan team included Brackcides Agala, Janet Wanja, Dorcas Ndasaba and Catherine Wanjiru. Mildred Odwako was said to be the "best digger" and Janet Wanja was the "best setter". Dorcas Ndasaba was judged "best player" after she gained the final point to deliver victory in straight sets.

In 2008 they failed to qualify for the 2008 Summer Olympics after they were beaten by Algeria and four years later Algeria again denied them qualification for the 2012 Summer Olympics in London.

In 2015 Brackcides Agala was the captain of the team and Janet Wanja assisted her. The team announced that they refused to play for the 2015 FIVB World Grand Prix in Canberra after several victories. The players were annoyed that they had not been paid money that had been promised by the Kenya Volleyball Federation. The boycott was successful and the team played and won against Peru. However, the KVF were not pleased and when the team's were announced for the 2016 Summer Olympics neither Khadambi or her assistant Janet Wanja were asked to the qualifying matches and the team failed to qualify.

In 2020, under the new head coach of Paul Bitok, Kenya's women's volleyball team won the gold medal at the African Games and they qualified for the postponed 2020 Summer Olympics which was the first time in sixteen years.

2020 Olympics
Kenya women's volleyball team qualified for the postponed 2020 Summer Olympics by winning the pool round with three match points and securing an outright berth at the African Olympic Qualification Tournament in Yaoundé, Cameroon, marking the nation's return to the Olympics for the first time since Athens 2004.

The chosen players names were revealed on 26 June 2021. The Olympic team included the veteran Mercy Moim as captain and Jane Wacu also made the team, but former players Violet Makuto and Elizabeth Wanyama were not included. Kenya's "Most Valued Player" Brackcides Agala was included in the beach volleyball team. The team received additional coaching from six Brazilian coaches who visited Kenya and the team was then sent to Nairobi where they received additional coaching from the Brazilian coach . The other teams in their group in Tokyo are the home team Japan, Serbia, Brazil, Korea and the Dominican Republic.

The team set off from Kenya for the Olympics in Tokyo in three batches to try and minimise the chances of being affected by the COVID-19 pandemic. The team's captain Mercy Moim was chosen to be one of Kenya's flagbearers at the Olympics opening ceremony (Moim was the second woman to be given this honour following archer Shazad Anwar in 2016).

Their opening match was on 25 July in Tokyo against Japan. Surprisingly Paul Bitok was not on the match's touchline, but Brazilian coach  was announced as the head coach. He spoke to the press via the team manager.  The team lost their first match against Japan in straight sets.

2020 Olympic squad
Squad as announced in June 2021.

1 Jane Wacu 
4 Leonida Kasaya 
5 Sharon Chepchumba 
8 Joy Lusenaka 
10 Noel Murambi 
12 Gladys Ekaru 
13 Lorine Chebet 
14 Mercy Moim 
15 Pamela Jepkirui 
16 Agripina Kundu 
18 Emmaculate Chemtai 
19 Edith Mukuvilani

Results

Olympic Games

 1964 to 1996 — did not participate
 2000 — 11th place
 2004 — 11th place
 2008 — did not qualify
 2012 — did not qualify
 2016 — did not qualify
 2020 — 12th place

World Championship

 1994 — 13th place
 1998 — 13th place
 2002 — 21st place
 2006 — 21st place
 2010 — 21st place
 2014 — did not participate
 2018 — 20th place
 2022 — 19th place

World Cup

 2019 — 11th place

FIVB World Grand Prix

Women's African Volleyball Championship

 1991 — 1st place
 1993 — 1st place
 1995 — 1st place
 1997 — 1st place
 2003 — 2nd place
 2005 — 1st place
 2007 — 1st place

 2011 — 1st place
 2013 — 1st place
 2015 — 1st place
 2017 — 2nd place
 2019 — 2nd place
 2021 — 2nd place

All-Africa Games

2021 Beach volleyball Olympic team
Kenya also has a women's national beach volleyball team. The team that gained Kenya qualification for the postponed 2020 Summer Olympics was Yvonne Wavinya, Brackcides Agala, Phosca Kasisi and Gaudencia Makokha. They qualified when they won at the African Continental Cup Finals in Morocco in 2021. They gained victory in a final against the Nigeria women's national volleyball team. Wavinga and Kasisi beat Tochukwu Nnoruga and Albertina Francis 2-0 while Agala and Makokha beat the other Nigerian pair of Francisca Ikhiede and Amara Uchechukwu 2–1.

Kenya's beach volleyballers were in the four Continental Cup winners with Argentina, Cuba and China. Kenya has never had a beach volleyball team at the Olympics and they are only the fourth African country to send a team.
The four players who qualified will make up Kenya's Olympic beach volleyball team chosen by the coach Sammy Mulinge. They will compete initially with the teams from Brazil, the US and Latvia in pool D at the postponed 2020 Summer Olympics in Tokyo. The volleyballers stayed in Mombasa for training before flying to Tokyo. They were the African champions, but the pandemic meant that many of their future opponents had been able to play more matches.

2021 Sitting Volleyball Paralympic team
Kenya's sitting volleyball team failed to qualify in the round robin contests in Kigali in September 2019. Rwanda won the place putting Egypt into second place in the final.

Previous squads

 1991 World Cup squad
 Doris Wefwafwa
 Nancy Lijodi
 Anne Wekhomba
 Lena Serem
 Pamela Mukima
 Jane Njeri-Onyango
 Nancy Sikobe
 Lucy Kamweru
 Beatrice Kwoba
 Dorcas Murunga
 Catherine Mabwi
 Mary Ayuma
 1994 World Championship squad
 Rhoda Vwosi
 Nancy Sikobe
 Helen Elele
 Jane Mwai
 Esther Birgen
 Esther Barno
 Esther Ouna
 Doris Wefwafwa
 Truphosa Lai
 Mary Ayuma
 Purity Ogolla
 Jacqueline Makokha
  Dorcas Murunga
 Nancy Lijodi
 Joan Mwandihi
 Pettie Antargu
 Anne Wekhomba
 Susan Kahure
 1998 World Championship squad
 Margaret Indakala
 Catherine Mabwi
 Edna Chepngeno
 Doris Wefwafwa
 Helen Elele
 Dorcas Ndasaba
 Roselidah Obunaga
 Jacqueline Makokha
 Esther Barno
 Mary Ayuma
 Nancy Lusanji
 Judith Serenge
 2000 Summer Olympic squad
 Dorcas Ndasaba
 Doris Wefwafwa
 Edna Chepngeno
 Emily Wesutila
 Gladys Nasikanda
 Jacqueline Makokha
 Judith Serenge
 Margaret Indakala
 Mary Ayuma
 Nancy Lusanji
 Roselidah Obunaga
 Violet Barasa
 2002 World Championship squad
 Philister Sang
 Margaret Mukoya
 Rodah Lyali
 Abigael Tarus
 Catherine Wanjiru
 Lucy Chege
 Dorcas Ndasaba
 Salome Wanjala
 Leonidas Kamende
 Violet Barasa
 Nancy Lusanji
 Mercy Wesutila
 2004 Summer Olympic squad
 Philister Sang
 Abigael Tarus
 Nancy Nyongesa
 Catherine Wanjiru
 Janet Wanja
 Dorcas Ndasaba
 Roselidah Obunaga
 Leonidas Kamende
 Violet Barasa
 Gladys Nasikanda
 Mercy Wesutila
 Judith Serenge
 2007 World Cup squad
 Jane Wacu
 Diana Khisa
 Doris Palanga
 Catherine Wanjiru
 Janet Wanja
 Dorcas Ndasaba
 Jackline Barasa
 Lydia Maiyo
 Mercy Moim
 Brackcides Khadambi
 Judith Tarus
 Edinah Rotich
 2011 World Cup squad
 Everlyne Makuto
 Esther Wangeci
 Diana Khisa
 Ruth Jepngetich
 Janet Wanja
 Roseline Odhiambo
 Noel Murambi
 Lydia Maiyo
 Mercy Moim
 Brackcides Khadambi
 Judith Tarus
 Florence Bosire
2015 World Cup squad
 Jane Wacu
 Everlyne Makuto
 Esther Wangeci
 Janet Wanja
 Triza Atuka
 Elizabeth Wanyama
 Noel Murambi
 Lydia Maiyo
 Mercy Moim
 Brackcides Khadambi
 Ruth Jepngetich
 Monica Biama
 2018 World Championship squad
 Jane Wacu
 Christine Psiwa
 Violet Makuto
 Leonida Kasaya
 Sharon Chepchumba
 Janet Wanja
 Triza Atuka
 Elizabeth Wanyama
 Noel Murambi
 Mercy Moim (capt)
 Lorine Chebet
 Agripina Kundu
 Emmaculate Chemtai
 Edith Mukuvilani

References

External links
CAVB Site

Volleyball in Kenya
Volleyball
National women's volleyball teams